Shaw Mansion may refer to:
 Shaw Mansion (New London, Connecticut), listed on the NRHP in Connecticut
 Shaw Mansion (Barton, Maryland), listed on the NRHP in Maryland

See also
Shaw House (disambiguation)